is a Japanese light novel series written by Nisio Isin and illustrated by Take. The series was published in Japan between February 2002 and November 2005 by Kodansha Books in nine volumes. Celebrating the twentieth anniversary of Nisio's debut in 2022, the tenth volume of the series was announced titled Kidnap Kidding: The Blue Savant and the Daughter of the Nonsense User, expected to be released on February 8, 2023. It was then followed by a seven-volume spin-off series also published by Kodansha Books, the  series, focusing on the Zerozaki clan. A second spin-off series focused on Jun Aikawa titled  series was serialized in the Mephisto magazine, and was collected by Kodansha in five volumes. First two volumes of Zaregoto were initially released in North America by Del Rey Manga, but have since been republished by Vertical, who also released the third volume. An eight-episode original video animation series adaptation of the first volume by Shaft was released between October 2016 and September 2017.

Plot
The story revolves around a narrator, whose name is never mentioned, and the mysteries he encounters. After the second book, the series starts including more and more fighting and action. The narrator tends to try, in vain, to stay out of the story, but instead of being the bystander he wants to be, he always gets dragged into the center of everything. Even though it seems the narrator does a lot in the story, he always finds out at the end that whatever he accomplished was meaningless.

Setting
According to Tomo's explanation, the world is divided into four separate kinds of territories:
The "Outer" World (The world of peace and war) is the normal side of the world. The holder of the highest mediocrity.
The "Economical" World (The Four Gods and One Mirror, <RULE>) is the holder of the strongest economical powers of the world. The closest to the "Outer" World.
The "Political" World (The Kunagisa Organization) is the holder of the strongest ruling powers of the world.
The "Violence" World (The Murdering Name, The Cursing Name) is the holder of all unusual, heterodoxy, special powers of the world. This world is a world with no order, only lawless massacre.

Characters

The "Outer" World

"I"'s relationships

. The narrator of the Zaregoto series, people call him by all sorts of nicknames beginning with the phonetic pronunciation of his family name Ii (井伊) such as "Ii-chan" (いーちゃん）, "Ikkun"  (いっくん), "Ii-tan"　(いいたん). Birthday is in March, birthplace Kobe. His real name was never revealed, but in Hanging High School he played a name-guessing quiz with Shiogi Hagihara (later mentioned), but the answer was not revealed either.
After graduating eighth grade, he entered the ER3 system (a type of genius raising school) and went to Houston, Texas for five years; with the death of his good friend, Magokoro Omokage, he withdrew from the system. Now, he is a resident of the Antique Apartment, second floor, and also a student in the Rokumeikan Private University. He consistently downplays his own abilities and extremely apathetic. He inevitably ends up solving the mysteries he encounters but at the end of each mystery realizes his activities were meaningless. Many characters he encounters including himself are morally grey and representing extreme philosophical ideals.

"Humanity's Strongest". Known famously throughout the world as humanity's strongest contractor. About 24 years old. Whatever legal or illegal, if paid she will get it done. A master of disguising, sound imitating, lock picking (even ones with fingerprint scanners), and mind reading. Presented with the names "the Most Powerful Private Contractor in the World", "the World's Greatest Entrepreneur", "Overkilled Red", "Desert Eagle", "One Against A Thousand", "The Storm Before The Storm"...
In the first book, Jun was invited to help solve the murder on the island, but she does not appear until the novel's epilogue. At the beginning of the book, Ii-chan presumes that Aikawa is a man.

"I"'s little sister. When she was young, she was kidnapped by the Kunagisa organization. When "I" and Tomo met, he still didn't know of his little sister's existence, even though she was living almost right beside him. She is one of the few people who knows of "I"'s true name. She died in an airplane accident.

The Residents of the Antique Apartment
The apartment which "I" lives in. The real name of this place is unknown, "I" is the only one calling it The Antique Apartment. Existed before the Meiji period. Made mainly of wood, three stories, four-mat room with horrible sound insulation, bare light bulb,  shared toilet, no bath; the rent is 10,000 yen per month, though.

"I"'s neighbor. 22 years old. A freeter, and also a master of kendo and kenjutsu. Kicked out of her previous apartment, she was taken in by Nanami Nanananami after found wandering in the streets. Always keeps her hair in a ponytail, usually wears a jinbei, with kanji representing her emotions at the moment, over casual clothing at home. Miiko hardly expresses her feeling through facial expression, but surprisingly, she has a rough temper when fighting. Once an information is received by her, it will be hard to make any changes to it afterwards. Likes sweet things, sake, and collecting antiques. Owns a Fiat 500, which is often borrowed by "I". Can never stop getting into trouble with the guests at a new work place, but still finds a job teaching at a kendo school momentarily.
Miiko is really concerned about "I"'s personality. "I" confessed to Miiko, but she reserved it saying she'll consider about it if "I" becomes a better man. Once had four relationships going at the same time, and three were girls, because she can't resist wanting to help the weak do everything for them.

"I"'s Classmates
In the second book, "I" attends Rokumeikan Private University. It is located in Kinugasa, in Kita Ward of Kyoto.

Born on April 20. According to "I"'s assumption, Mikoko is about 155cm and 50kg, a fairly normal girl. Usually has a high temper, and will hit anything nearby randomly. Owns a vespa(vintage model) and calls it "scoot", which made "I" very angry because he thinks it's disrespecting for the vespa. Likes to use exaggerating metaphors. Will take off clothes when drunk. Have feelings for "I". Tomoe Emoto's first friend, and best friends with Muimi Atemiya.

Born on May 14, 20 years-old. A petit girl with twin tails, but has an aura of an adult. Likes shiny things. Lives alone. Tomoe stayed in the hospital for a long time during middle school, so she is actually held back for a year.　She became friends with Mikoko in high school, because having an inferiority complex made her see Mikoko as an ideal being. Will become a kissing maniac when drunk. One of the few girls "I" is interested in. The witness of the beginning of the Kyoto serial killing.

A yankee(delinquent). Brown hair. Has a little sister named Muri(Muimi means no meaning, Muri means unreasonable). Been smoking since elementary, but she doesn't smoke around non-smokers. She went to the same elementary school as Mikoko, and became friends with her because she saved Muimi from the depths of delinquency.

Went to the same high school as Mikoko. Brown hair. A very normal human being, "I" can never remember what he looks like. Has a frivolous personality. After the second book ends, "I" completely forgets about his existence.

The Police

A police officer, teamed up with Ikaruga. Has a business like relationship with Jun Aikawa. Kyoto Prefectural Investigation group, First Division(murder cases) chief. Straight black hair with a cool and calm mind.

A police officer, teamed up with Sasa. Kyoto Prefectural Investigation group, First Division member. Wears a sun glasses, black hair combed all back, tall. A normal person.

The "Violence" World
The Killing Names consists of seven families, "Niounomiya(匂宮)", "Yamiguchi(闇口)", "Zerozaki(零崎)", "Susukino(薄野)", "Hakamori(墓森)", "Tenbuki(天吹)", "Ishinagi(石凪)". The sequence starts with the strongest. These families possess incredibly ridiculous killing abilities.
The Cursing Names consists of six families, "Tokinomiya(時宮)", "Tsumiguchi(罪口)", "Kino(奇野)", "Nukumori(拭森)", "Shibugi(死吹)", "Toganagi(咎凪)". The sequence starts with the strongest. These families refuse any physical battle, but the deaths caused by them are no less than The Killing Names. They attack their enemies through abnormal ways such as hypnotism, poison, and other ways; to defeat their enemies, they will not hesitate to deceive their allies as well. Every family has an opposing side in the different Names, for example: Niounomiya's opposing family is Tokinomiya(the second kanji in their names are the same)...The only exception is the Zerozaki family.

Niounomiya
Known as the "Niounomiya Circus". Ranked first in the Killing Names. A family that kills under contract. Due to their special techniques when killing, people refer to them as "The Killing Magic Organization, Niounomiya Circus". There are a total of fifty-three branch families, including the Sawarabi family and the Miotsukushi family under the Niounomiya family. The opposing family in The Cursing Names is the Tokinomiya family.

Carnival. The little sister of the Niounomiya siblings and Izumu's counterpart. She is a detective dressed in a black mantle and a straitjacket. Currently 16 years old (her body is 22 years old). She does the investigating for the Niounomiya siblings. All of Izumu's weaknesses are harbored by her. A former member of the Thirteen Stairs.

Man Eater. The big brother of the Niounomiya siblings and Rizumu's counterpart. While Izumu and Rizumu have identical female bodies, Izumu's consciousness is male. Currently 18 years old (his body is 22 years old). He does the killing for the Niounomiya siblings.

Zerozaki
Known as the "Zerozaki Bandits". Rank third in The Killing Names. A group of unreasonable serial killers gathered not by blood relations, but by the thirst for blood. Contains twenty to twenty-five members. The only family without an opposing family in The Cursing Names.

The Human Failure. A child born through incestuous action(no blood relations, meaning two Zerozakis gave birth to him), a Zerozaki in the Zerozaki. The serial killer of the Kyoto serial killing. "I" was supposed to become one of his victims when he encounter him on Friday 13th under the bridge. Has a tattoo on the right side of his face, dyed hair, three earrings on the right ear and one cellphone strap on the left ear. He is about 150cm tall. Zerozaki is the mirror self of "I", hence the other way around, too. Always wears a vest full of knives.

The "Politics" World
The "Politics" world is controlled by the Kunagisa Organization, one of the few Zaibatsu that still exists in Japan. Seven organizations that hold control of the world is under Kunagisa, it consists of "Ichigai(壱外)", "Nishiori(壱弐栞)", "Sanzaka(参榊)", "Shikabane(肆屍)", "Gotoride(伍砦)", "Rokukase(陸枷)", and lastly "Hachikiri(捌限)". All of their name starts with a number, with seven(柒) not included in the list.

"The Blue Savant". Due to the recessive genes, she has an unusual appearance consisting blue eyes and blue hair, but is still a beauty. Diagnosed with Savant Syndrome. 19 years old.
Tomo is Ii-chan's closest friend. She is a genius in the field of computer engineering with a very eccentric personality. While Ii-chan was in Houston, she led a group of notorious computer hackers consisting of nine people including herself.

Tomo's big brother. He became the leader of the Kunagisa Organization during the latter part of the story (was formerly the secretary of his father). He has a well-rounded personality that appeals to people around him, which is completely different from his little sister. He has a sister complex.

Nao Kunagisa's close friend. His whereabouts are unknown. He is the one who first called I the Nonsense Bearer. He is also the one who gave Tomo the nickname Blue Servant.

The "Economical" World
The "Economical" world consists of five big Zaibatsu, "Akagami(赤神)", "Iigami(謂神)", "Ujigami(氏神)", "Ekagami(絵鏡
)", and "Origami(檻神)". Together, they are called the "Four Gods and One Mirror(四神一鏡)".

Four Gods and One Mirror's relationships

A true princess of the Akagami plutocrat, but was exiled to Wet Crow's Feather Island due to D.L.L.R Syndrome(a sickness that makes people want to kill). The little sister of the twins. Now, she is the owner of the island and has an inexhaustible amount of time and money.
Has an unshakable trust towards Jun. 21years-old.

Rei is the head maid on Wet Crow's Feather Island.

The eldest of the triplets. A maid on Wet Crow's Island. Has an upheaval personality, but very smart. 27 years-old.

The second of the triplets. A maid on Wet Crow's Island. Likes to haggle, has a bit of mysophobia. 27 years-old.

The third of the triplets. A maid on Wet Crow's Island. Rarely talks, but if she opens her mouth, only lies will come out. Iria's bodyguard, has superior fighting skills(quote Hikari," Invincible in short range" ). 27 years-old. Once defeated the notorious Kishishiki Zerozaki wearing an iron mask, so was known as the "Masked Maid". The only triplet who wears glasses.

Guests on Wet Crow's island
Wet Crow's Island
is the property of the Akagami Plutocrats. Its purpose is to keep the exiled heiress away from the rest of the world. In Russian, it means "The End of Despair". Now, it is a place for geniuses to gather under the invitation of Iria.

Genius scholar. One of the Seven Fools in the ER3 system, and the first Japanese to enter in her twenties. 30 years-old. Raised out of Japan, so she is bad at yojijukugo, but very proud of her math and English abilities. Black straight hair, tall for a woman with a slender body. Went to a normal public high school. Severed her ties with her family. Champion of a karate tournament.

Blue-eyed, blond genius painter. The ultimate individualist. Was blind several years ago, now, her body is weak and handicapped, uses a wheel chair. She doesn't have a fixed style of painting. 29 years-old. She always has an air of mystery around her, likes to keep a clean and neat appearance corresponding her huge pride. Her catchphrase is," Don't you know?" It is revealed at the end of the first book that she and Akane had swapped bodies and she killed her later.

One of the two none geniuses invited(Shinya and "I"). The caretaker and former teacher of Kanami. 32 years-old.

A genius fortune-teller, has a cynical personality. 29 years-old. An ESPer, has the ability to see the past, see the future, use telepathy, see through, hear everything. She described her ability as watching large amounts of TV about other people without her on will, but she can only see two more years in her own future. Blond ponytail. Her catch phrase is," I know the past, the future, people, and the world. I am an ESPer who knows everything."
She constantly picks on Ii-chan due to his personality.

The genius chef of Wet Crow's Island. Can create the ultimate delicacy for the diners preference. Short hair with a straightforward personality. 30 years-old. Has absolute pitch and absolute taste. Can identify up to twenty thousand different kinds of tastes and twenty different levels of pitches.
The most frightened after the murdering started, which is to say the most normal one since nobody except her was influenced by the dangerous atmosphere.

Media

Novels

Zaregoto Series

Ningen Series

Saikyō Series

Anime
An anime adaptation by Shaft was announced in May 2016, which was later confirmed to be an original video animation series adaptation of the novel series' first volume in August 2016. The anime series spans 8 episodes across 8 home video release volumes, which were released between October 26, 2016 and September 27, 2017. The series is directed by Yuki Yase and Akiyuki Shinbo, and written by Yukito Kizawa and Munemasa Nakamoto, featuring character designs by Akio Watanabe and music by Yuki Kajiura. The opening theme song is "Cobalt World" by Sangatsu no Phantasia, and the ending theme song is "Märchen" by Kalafina. The final episode, episode 8, was produced with assistance from studio Peace & Kindness. The series has several chief animation directors: Akio Watanabe himself, Hirofumi Suzuki of Naruto fame (who worked with Shinbo on Le Portrait de Petit Cossette), and Rina Iwamoto (from CUES). Akihisa Takano (from Shaft) joined as chief animation director starting on episode 2, and Shaft's Hiroki Yamamura joined for the eighth and final episode as well.

Episode list

Character commentary
Character commentaries are available on the DVD/BD releases of Kubikiri Cycle. Jun Aikawa receives some characters from the whole series for a conversation about the specific episode they are in. Nisio Isin wrote each commentary of the eight episodes.

  (Aniplex. 2016)
  Jun Aikawa and Toromi Nagatoro
  (Aniplex. 2016)
  Jun Aikawa and Gazelle Inpara
  (Aniplex. 2017)
  Jun Aikawa and Miyori Jikumoto
  (Aniplex. 2017)
  Jun Aikawa and Kōta Ishimaru
  (Aniplex. 2017)
  Jun Aikawa and Sasaki Sasa
  (Aniplex. 2017)
  Jun Aikawa and Toromi Nagatoro and Gazelle Inpara
  (Aniplex. 2017)
  Jun Aikawa and Yayoi Sashirono
  (Aniplex. 2017)
  Jun Aikawa and I

Development
The Kubikiri Cycle went through a number of drafts; Tomo Kunagisa was originally intended to be the series' protagonist,  but during the rewriting process, Nisio Isin realized that Ii-chan had become more important. After finally completing the novel, Nisio proceeded to write Strangulation Romanticist in three days. With Hanging High School, Nisio began consciously moving the series away from traditional mystery novel structure.

Reception
The Kubikiri Cycle, the first volume of Zaregoto series, won the 23rd Mephisto Prize in 2002.

The series has been selected by Takarajimasha's Kono Light Novel ga Sugoi! three times as one of the ten best light novels of the year: in 2005 when it ranked second, in 2006 when it topped the list, and in 2007 when it placed third.

The series was a bestseller, and grew in popularity as it went on. While the first volume debuted at number eight on the novel charts, the final volume debuted at number one and remained at the top for three weeks.

Notes

References

External links

Further reading
 
 

2002 Japanese novels
2004 Japanese novels
Anime composed by Yuki Kajiura
Del Rey Manga
Japanese serial novels
Light novels
Shaft (company)
Vertical (publisher) titles
Nisio Isin